Wadsworth  may refer to:

People
 Wadsworth (surname)
 Wadsworth (given name)

Places 
 Wadsworth, Illinois, United States, a village
 Wadsworth, Kansas, United States
 Wadsworth, Nevada, United States, a census-designated place
 Wadsworth, Ohio, United States, a city
 Wadsworth, Texas, United States, an unincorporated community
 Wadsworth, West Yorkshire, England, a civil parish
 Wadsworth Township, Medina County, Ohio, United States

Other 
 Wadsworth Atheneum, art museum in Connecticut
 Wadsworth Center, public-health laboratory in New York 
 Wadsworth Institute, Mennonite seminary in Wadsworth, Ohio (1868-1878)
 Wadsworth Chapel and Wadsworth Theatre, on the campus of the West Los Angeles Department of Veterans Affairs Medical Center, California
 Wadsworth Congregational Church, a historic church in Whitsett, North Carolina
 Wadsworth Union Church, Wadsworth, Nevada
 USS Wadsworth, three ships
 Wadsworth Barracks, an Australian Army base in Bandiana, Victoria, Australia
 Wadsworth Memorial Handicap, a Thoroughbred horse race run at Finger Lakes Race Track, New York
 Wadsworth Electric Manufacturing Company, a Covington, Kentucky company that went out of business in 1990
 Wadsworth Publishing, part of Cengage Learning
 Wadsworth the Butler, a character in the 1985 film Clue

See also 
 Henry Wadsworth Longfellow, American poet
 Wadsworth Falls State Park, Connecticut
 Fort Wadsworth, New York
 Wadsworth Fort Site, an archaeological site at Geneseo, New York
 Wadsworth Mansion at Long Hill, Middletown, Connecticut
 Wadworth 
 Horner–Wadsworth–Emmons reaction, a variation on the Wittig chemical reaction
 Wadsworth constant deviation system, optics, a way to mount prisms or gratings on a turntable